Nematullo Quttiboev (born 28 September 1973) is an Uzbek professional football and coach and former player who played for FC Pakhtakor Tashkent in the Uzbek League and FC Ordabasy the Kazakhstan Premier League.

Playing career
He started his playing career in 1991 at Aral Nukus. He is one of the most scoring forwards of Uzbek League with 106 goals and also member of Gennadi Krasnitsky club with 131 goals.

International
He made official debut for Uzbekistan national team on 16 November 1998 in friendly match against India in Delhi. He played for Uzbekistan in the 2000 Asian Cup. Kutibayev completed 15 caps for national team, scoring 5 goals.

Managing career
In 2013, he started his managing career at FK Orol Nukus, club playing in Uzbekistan First League. He resigned head coach post at Orol Nukus in March 2016.

Honours

Club
 Neftchi
Uzbek League (1): 1995
Uzbek League runners-up (2): 1998, 1999
Uzbek Cup runners-up (1): 1998

 Pakhtakor
Uzbek League (1): 2002
Uzbek League runners-up (1): 2001
Uzbek Cup (2): 2001, 2002

Individual
Gennadi Krasnitsky club: 131 goals

Career statistics

International goals
Scores and results list. Uzbekistan's goal tally first.

References

External links
 
 

1973 births
Living people
Place of birth missing (living people)
Soviet footballers
Uzbekistani footballers
Uzbekistani expatriate footballers
Expatriate footballers in Kazakhstan
Uzbekistani expatriate sportspeople in Kazakhstan
Uzbekistan international footballers
Footballers at the 1998 Asian Games
FK Neftchi Farg'ona players
Pakhtakor Tashkent FK players
FC Ordabasy players
Association football forwards
Asian Games competitors for Uzbekistan